The Bushveldt Carbineers (BVC) were a short-lived, irregular mounted infantry regiment, raised in South Africa during the Second Boer War.

The 320-strong regiment was formed in February 1901 and commanded by an Australian, Colonel R. W. Lenehan. It was based at Pietersburg, 260 kilometres north-east of Pretoria, and saw action in the Spelonken region of northern Transvaal, during 1901–1902.

About two-fifths of the regiment's members had previously belonged to units recruited in Australia. The BVC also included about 40 Boers, who had been recruited at internment camps; among the members of the BVC, these Boers were known as "joiners".

The unit was later renamed as the Pietersburg Light Horse on 1 December 1902

Breaker Morant

The unit is portrayed in a 1980 film Breaker Morant in which Australian Lieutenants Harry "Breaker" Morant and Peter Handcock were serving when they were court martialed. They were executed on 27 February 1902 by a firing squad of Cameron Highlanders, having been convicted by the British army of murdering a civilian and Boer prisoners of war. Breaker Morant claimed that the BVC was given an order not to take prisoners. Lieutenant George Witton who had also been sentenced to death by the court-martial, later commuted to life imprisonment, was released after serving 28 months following a public outcry.

See also
 James Christie, an account by a member of the BVC (Bushveldt Carbineers)

References

The Bushveldt Carbineers and the Pietersburg Light Horse by William (Bill) Woolmore (2002, Slouch Hat Publications Australia) 

Military units and formations established in 1901
Military units and formations of the Second Boer War
Military units and formations of the British Empire
Counterinsurgency